African Urban Institute is a think tank that researches on urban development in Africa. It conducts research in urban development with three thematic areas: sustainable cities, prosperous cities and inclusive cities. Its focus areas include, urban mobility, land use planning, housing, environmental planning and urban governance. Its stated mission is to "Unlock urban development in Africa through better ideas and research." As a non-profit organisation, African Urban Institute describes itself as independent and non-partisan.

Publications 
African Urban Institute produces a biennial State of African Cities  report. It also publishes discussion papers, briefing papers and ViewPoints which are regular commentaries on urban development in Africa. The African Urban Institute Press publishes books and journals from the institute's own research as well as publishing work from other authors.  The books include, Dystopia: How the Tyranny of Specialists Fragment African Cities, Cape to Cairo: To Race to Sustainable Urban Transport in Africa.

Programs 
In 2018 the African Urban Institute established the African Urban Case Studies Initiative, an online repository of urban development case studies across Africa which seek to promote intra-continental policy transfer on urban development. African Urban Institute also convene a biennial Timbuktu Forum on Urban Development, a high-level forum that brings various urban development stakeholders to discuss urban development issues in Africa. Named after the ancient Malian city, Timbuktu, the Timbuktu Fellowship is awarded to early career urban development practitioners as fellows and to senior practitioners as senior fellows. The collaborations of the two seek to promote knowledge exchange between the young generation and the old.

Organizations
The African Planning Society is the membership organisation of urban planning professionals, civil society members and policymakers that advance planning of cities in Africa. Founded in 2016, formerly as African Urban Community of Practice, it was reorganised as African Planning Society in 2019. With a membership of  more than 1,200 planners,  the African Planning Society brings together planning professionals and urban development stakeholders across Africa.

See also 
 African Planning Society

References

Citations

External links 

 

Organizations established in 2016
Urban planning organizations
Think tanks based in Africa